Kedzie is a station on the Chicago Transit Authority's 'L' system, serving the Pink Line and the Lawndale neighborhood. It opened on March 10, 1902, as part of the Metropolitan West Side Elevated Railroad's Douglas Park branch. It was renovated between 2002 and 2004.

Structure
The station consists of a single elevated island platform. The main accessible full-service entrance with ticket vending machines and an elevator is located on the west side of Kedzie Avenue, while there is a secondary non-accessible farecard-only entrance on the east side of Kedzie Avenue. The platform is mostly made of concrete, but unlike the other Pink Line stations, there is a short section where the platform crosses Kedzie Avenue that is made of wood and has an older non-renovated shelter.

Bus connections
CTA
  52 Kedzie

Notes and references

Notes

References

External links

Kedzie Avenue entrance from Google Maps Street View

CTA Pink Line stations
Railway stations in the United States opened in 1902
1902 establishments in Illinois
North Lawndale, Chicago